Susan Buchbinder is an American physician who is best known for her work in HIV prevention and as a researcher in the HIV Vaccine Trials Network. In 2011, she was elected a fellow of the American Association for the Advancement of Science.  She is Clinical Professor of Medicine, Epidemiology and Biostatistics at the University of California, San Francisco.

Early life and education
Buchbinder graduated from Brown University and UCSF School of Medicine. Her residencey in general primary care was at San Francisco General Hospital.

Professional history
Buchbinder serves as the research director on HIV for the San Francisco Department of Public Health.  She is on the HIV and AIDS editorial board of Medscape.

Buchbinder was an investigator in the iPrEx study.

References

External links
profile at the UCSF Medical Center 
profile at the HIV Vaccine Trials Network

Living people
HIV/AIDS researchers
American public health doctors
Women public health doctors
Year of birth missing (living people)
Fellows of the American Association for the Advancement of Science
University of California, San Francisco alumni
Brown University alumni